is a Japanese manga artist. Her most famous work is the series After the Rain, which was serialized in Shogakukan's Monthly Big Comic Spirits magazine in June 2014, before moving to the magazine Weekly Big Comic Spirits in January 2016 and finished in March 2018. In 2018, she won the 63rd Shogakukan Manga Award in the general category with the manga.

Starting from November 2019, her work Kowloon Generic Romance, which is based on Kowloon Walled City in Hong Kong, is serialized in Shueisha's Weekly Young Jump. According to Mayuzuki, she had the idea of launching a series about Kowloon Walled City even when After the Rain was still serialized. She likes the topic of Kowloon Walled City and first knew about it from Kowloon's Gate when she was young.

Works 
  (2013–2014)
  (2014–2018)
  (2019–present)

References 

Manga artists
Living people
1983 births